Adolph Fürstner (1833–1908) was a German publisher. He worked as a clerk for Bote & Bock before he founded his own publishing company, 'Fürstner', in Berlin in 1868. He bought the publishers Gustav Mayer of Leipzig and Meser of Dresden in 1872. In 1900 he formed a contract with Richard Strauss and later published his opera Salome.

References

External links
List of Adolph Fürstner publications available at  International Music Score Library Project

German publishers (people)
1833 births
1908 deaths